Skylar Meade (born September 10, 1984) is an American baseball coach who is currently the head coach at Troy University.

Head coaching record

References

External links 
 

1984 births
Living people
Sportspeople from Louisville, Kentucky
Baseball players from Louisville, Kentucky
Baseball coaches from Kentucky
Baseball pitchers
Louisville Cardinals baseball players
Eastern Illinois Panthers baseball coaches
Middle Tennessee Blue Raiders baseball coaches
Michigan State Spartans baseball coaches
South Carolina Gamecocks baseball coaches
Troy Trojans baseball coaches
Eastern Illinois University alumni